Spam (stylized as SPAM) is a brand of salty processed canned pork made by Hormel Foods Corporation. It was introduced by Hormel in 1937 and gained popularity worldwide after its use during World War II. By 2003, Spam was sold in 41 countries (and trademarked in over 100) on six continents . In the U.S., Hawaii is the state with the highest per capita consumption of Spam, which has become an ingredient in Hawaiian cuisine (like sushi). 

The generic form of Spam may be sold in cans as "pork luncheon meat". Since its invention, it is now available in different flavours and using different meats. Like most hotdogs, Spam is precooked, making it safe and edible to eat straight from the can, but it is often cooked further to improve some characteristics of its palatability. 

Spam's basic ingredients are primarily pork shoulder and ham, with salt, water, modified potato starch (as a binder), sugar, and sodium nitrite (as a preservative). Natural gelatin is formed during cooking in its tins on the production line. Concerns about Spam's nutritional attributes have been raised, in large part due to its high content of fat, sodium, and preservatives.

Spam has affected popular culture, including a Monty Python skit, which repeated the name many times, leading to its name being borrowed to describe unsolicited electronic messages, especially email.  It is occasionally celebrated in festivals such as Austin's Spamarama.

History

Hormel introduced Spam on July 5, 1937. The Oxford Encyclopedia of Food and Drink in America states that the product was intended to increase the sale of pork shoulder, a cut which did not sell well.

Ken Daigneau, the brother of a company executive, won a $100 prize that year in a competition to name the new item. Hormel states that the meaning of the name "is known by only a small circle of former Hormel Foods executives," but a popular belief is that the name is a contraction of "spiced ham." It has also been speculated to be an acronym for "Shoulder of Pork And Ham."

The difficulty of delivering fresh meat to the front during World War II saw Spam become a ubiquitous part of the U.S. soldier's diet. It became variously referred to as "ham that didn't pass its physical," "meatloaf without basic training,"  and "Special Army Meat." Over  of Spam were purchased by the military before the war's end.

During World War II and the occupations that followed, Spam was introduced into Guam, Hawaii, Okinawa, the Philippines, and other islands in the Pacific. Immediately absorbed into native diets, it has become a unique part of the history and effects of U.S. influence in the Pacific islands.

As a consequence of World War II rationing and the Lend-Lease Act, Spam was sold in the United Kingdom. British Prime Minister Margaret Thatcher later referred to it as a "wartime delicacy."

In addition to increasing production for the U.K., Hormel expanded Spam output as part of Allied aid to the Soviet Union. In his memoir Khrushchev Remembers, Nikita Khrushchev declared: "Without Spam, we wouldn't have been able to feed our army."

Throughout the war, countries ravaged by the conflict and faced with strict food rations came to appreciate Spam.

The billionth can of Spam was sold in 1959, the seven billionth can was sold in 2007, and the eight billionth can was sold in 2012.

International usage

United States and territories

Domestically, Spam's chief advantages were affordability, accessibility, and extended shelf life. Statistics from the 1990s say that 3.8 cans of Spam were consumed every second in the United States, totaling nearly 122 million cans annually. It became part of the diet of almost 30% of American households, perceived differently in various regions of the country. It is also sometimes associated with economic hardship because of its relatively low cost.

Spam that is sold in North America, South America, and Australia is produced in Austin, Minnesota (also known as "Spam Town USA") and in Dubuque, Iowa. Austin, Minnesota also had a restaurant with a menu devoted exclusively to Spam called "Johnny's SPAMarama Menu."

Hawaii 

Residents of the state of Hawaii have the highest per capita consumption in the United States, bringing in sales of 7 million cans of SPAM per year. Its perception there is very different from on the mainland. Hawaiians sometimes call it "Portagee Steak".

A local dish in Hawaii is Spam musubi, where cooked Spam is placed atop rice and wrapped in a band of nori, a form of nigiri. Varieties of Spam are found in Hawaii and Saipan that are unavailable in other markets, including Honey Spam, Spam with Bacon, and Hot and Spicy Spam.

Hawaiian Burger King restaurants began serving Spam in 2007 to compete with the local McDonald's chains (which also serve Spam). In Hawaii, Spam is so popular that it is sometimes referred to as "The Hawaiian Steak". There is even an annual Spam-themed festival on the island of Oahu that takes place every spring, known as the "Waikiki Spam Jam". Local chefs and restaurants compete to create new Spam-themed dishes, which are then sold in a massive street fair on Kalakaua Avenue in Waikiki.

In 2017, Hawaii was plagued by a rash of thefts of Spam. Spam had long been a target of thieves in Hawaii, but the magnitude of the thefts ramped up, with incidents in which multiple cases of Spam were stolen at once. Local retailers believe organized crime was involved. This came alongside increases in thefts of some other retail goods, such as corned beef and liquor. The president of the retail merchants of Hawaii attributed the rise in retail thefts to a recent change in criminal law, which raised the threshold at which a theft would lead to felony charges by approximately $400.

Guam and the Northern Marianas 
In Guam, the average per capita consumption is 16 tins (cans) per year. It is also found on McDonald's menus there. The Spam Games also occur in Guam, where locals sample and honor the best original, homemade Spam recipes.

In the Northern Mariana Islands, lawyers from Hormel have threatened to sue the local press for publishing articles alleging ill effects of high Spam consumption on the health of the local population.

Puerto Rico 
Sandwich de Mezcla is a party staple in Puerto Rico containing Spam, Velveeta, and pimientos (made into a spread) between two slices of sandwich bread.

Europe

United Kingdom
After World War II, Newforge Foods, part of the Fitch Lovell group, was awarded the license to produce the product in the U.K. at its Gateacre factory, Liverpool, where it stayed until production switched to the Danish Crown Group (owners of the Tulip Food Company) in 1998.

The United Kingdom has adopted Spam into various recipes. For example, recipes include Spam Yorkshire Breakfast, Spamish Omelette, and Spam Hash. Spam can also be sliced, battered and deep-fried into Spam fritters.

Southeast Asia

Philippines

In the Philippines, Spam (currently distributed by the Purefoods-Hormel Company Inc.) is a popular food item seen as a cultural symbol. Spam reached the islands similarly as it did other former US colonies such as Hawaii and Guam: as a result of World War II rationing. Spam is commonly eaten with rice (usually garlic fried rice) and a sunny-side-up egg for breakfast. It is prepared and used in a variety of ways, including being fried, caramelized, served with condiments, or in sandwiches. It has also been featured in numerous Filipino fusion cuisine dishes, including Spam burgers, Spam spaghetti, and Spam nuggets.

The popularity of Spam in the Philippines transcends economic class, and the canned product is even given during holidays. There are at least ten different varieties of Spam currently available in the country, and an estimated 1.25 million kilos of the meat is sold every year in the Philippines. Its popularity among Filipinos has led to the creation of a version with sugar and annatto—Tocino-flavor Spam, made for the overseas Filipino market in the US and Canada. During the rescue efforts after Typhoon Ondoy (Ketsana) in 2009, Hormel Foods donated over 30,000 pounds of Spam to the Philippine National Red Cross.

East Asia

China
In mainland China, Hormel decided to adopt a different strategy to market Spam, promoting it as a foreign, premium food product and changing the Spam formula to be meatier to accommodate local Chinese tastes. Spam-like canned pork products are also produced by other food companies in China as "Luncheon Meat".

Hong Kong
After World War II, meat was scarce and expensive in Hong Kong, so Spam was an accessible, affordable alternative. The luncheon meat has been incorporated into dishes such as macaroni with fried egg and spam in chicken soup, as well as ramen.

Japan
In Okinawa, Japan, the product is added into onigiri alongside eggs and used as a staple ingredient in the traditional Okinawan dish chanpurū, and a Spam burger is sold by local fast food chain Jef. For the 70th anniversary of Spam in 2007, cans with special designs were sold in Japan due to its popularity, primarily in Okinawa.
Following the March 2011 earthquake, Spam sales in Japan declined, and Hormel shifted its focus to China, although Hormel did pledge to donate $100,000 along with cans of Spam for relief efforts.

In early 2014, Burger King introduced the Spam and Cheese burger as a breakfast menu item.

South Korea
Spam was widely consumed within South Korea during the Korean War, and its popularity led to the creation of the Spam kimbap (rice and vegetable filled seaweed roll) in Korean cuisine. Because of a scarcity of fish and other traditional kimbap products such as kimchi or fermented cabbage, Spam was added to a rice roll with kimchi and cucumber and wrapped in seaweed. US soldiers also used spam in South Korea as a means of trading for items, services, or information around their bases.

In South Korea, Spam (licensed from Hormel by CJ CheilJedang) is popular with a majority of the population. , South Korea produced and consumed more Spam than any other country except the United States.

Spam is also an original ingredient in budae jjigae (부대찌개; literally "army base stew"), a spicy stew with different types of preserved meat or kimchi, etc.

In popular culture

Beginning in 1940, Spam sponsored George Burns and Gracie Allen on their radio program.

During World War II, Spam was not only eaten but was also incorporated into many other aspects of the war (grease for guns, cans for scrap metal, etc.); it was so prominent that Uncle Sam was nicknamed "Uncle Spam." Other terms influenced by the product's name include the European invasion fleet or the "Spam Fleet." Furthermore, the United Service Organizations (USO) toured the "Spam Circuit."  In 1943, comedian Suzette Tarri appeared as the harassed waitress character "Mrs Spam" in the British film Somewhere in Civvies.<ref>[https://www2.bfi.org.uk/films-tv-people/4ce2b76ec175c  "Somewhere in Civvies, BFI] . Retrieved 21 October 2020</ref>

In the United States in the aftermath of World War II, a troupe of former servicewomen was assembled by Hormel Foods to promote Spam from coast to coast. The group was known as the Hormel Girls and associated the food with patriotism.  In 1948, two years after its formation, the troupe had grown to 60 women, with 16 forming an orchestra. The show became a radio program where the main selling point was Spam. The Hormel Girls were disbanded in 1953.

Spam has long had a somewhat dubious reputation in the United States and (to a lesser degree) in the United Kingdom as a poverty food. The image of Spam as a low-cost meat product gave rise to the Scottish colloquial term "Spam valley" to describe certain affluent housing areas where residents appear to be wealthy but, in reality, may be living at poverty levels.

Spam was featured in an iconic 1970 Monty Python sketch called "Spam." Set in a café that mostly served dishes containing Spam, including "egg and Spam, egg bacon and Spam, Spam egg sausage and Spam, Spam egg Spam Spam bacon and Spam, " the piece also featured a companion song. Because of its use in a line of a song in Monty Python and the Holy Grail, the title of the musical version of the film became Spamalot.

The 1971 Baby Huey song "Hard Times" includes the lyrics "So many hard times...Eatin' Spam and Oreos and drinkin' Thunderbird baby," in which Spam and the other products are cited as examples of the speaker's destitute existence.

By the 1990s, Spam's reputation as a low-quality food led to its name being adopted for unsolicited electronic messages, especially spam email.

Spam is the subject of the "Weird Al" Yankovic song "Spam," which is a parody of the R.E.M. song "Stand."

Other offshoots of Spam in popular culture include a book of haikus about Spam titled Spam-Ku: Tranquil Reflections on Luncheon Loaf. There is also a mock Church of Spam and a Spam Cam, which is a webcam trained on a can of decaying Spam.

Spam is referred to in Island of the Sequined Love Nun by Christopher Moore, where SPAM is explained as Shaped Pork Approximating Man'', which was used to explain its popularity amongst Pacific Island Cannibals.

The Pumpkin Spice flavour, introduced in September 2019, has gained the attention of the media and the public.

Spam celebrations

Spam is celebrated in Austin, Minnesota, home to the Spam Museum. The museum tells the history of the Hormel company, the origin of Spam, and its place in world culture.

Austin is also the location of the final judging in the national Spam recipe competition. Competing recipes are collected from winning submissions at the top 40 state fairs in the nation. The Spamettes are a quartet from Austin that only sing about Spam in parodies of popular songs. They first performed at the first Spam Jam in 1990 and continue to perform at various events.

Hawaii holds an annual Spam Jam in Waikiki during the last week of April. The small town of Shady Cove, Oregon is home to the annual Spam Parade and Festival, with the city allocating US$1,500 for it.

Spamarama was a yearly festival from 1978 to 2007 in Austin, Texas which had a peak attendance of 14,000. The themed events included a Spam cook-off (to contrast with Texas chili cook-offs) and the Spamalymplics, including a "Spam toss" and a Spamburger (a 12-ounce portion on a bun) eating contest. The event returned in 2019.

On August 8, 2021, L & L Hawaiian Barbecue established "National SPAM® Musubi Day" to celebrate the iconic snack from Hawaii.  The celebration also happened on August 8, 2022, and has since become an annual celebration.

Nutritional data

The ingredients of Spam vary according to variety and market; those of variety "Spam Classic" are pork with ham, salt, water, modified potato starch, sugar, and sodium nitrite.

Varieties
The official Spam website lists numerous different flavors of Spam products. In addition to the variety of flavors, Spam is sold in tins smaller than the twelve-ounce standard size. Spam Singles are also available, which are single sandwich-sized slices of Spam Classic or Lite, sealed in retort pouches.

See also

 
 
 
  – a Hawaiian dish that uses Spam in some versions
 
 
 Prem
 Treet
  – a canned, stewed meat

References

External links

 
  – United States
 Collection of mid-twentieth century advertising featuring Spam from The TJS Labs Gallery of Graphic Design.

 
Brand name meats
Hawaiian cuisine
Hormel Foods brands
Pork
Products introduced in 1937
Food and drink introduced in the 1930s
Ham
Canned meat
Canned food